Thomas James Edric George (born 22 September 1994) is a British rower. He won a bronze medal at the 2018 World Rowing Championships in Plovdiv, Bulgaria, as part of the eight with James Rudkin, Alan Sinclair, Tom Ransley, Moe Sbihi, Oliver Wynne-Griffith, Matthew Tarrant, Will Satch and Henry Fieldman. He won a silver medal in the eight at the 2019 European Rowing Championships. He won another bronze medal at the 2019 World Rowing Championships in Ottensheim, Austria as part of the eight with Rudkin, Josh Bugajski, Sbihi, Jacob Dawson, Wynne-Griffith, Tarrant, Thomas Ford and Fieldman.

In 2021, he won a European gold medal in the eight in Varese, Italy.

References

External links

Thomas George at British Rowing

Living people
1994 births
British male rowers
World Rowing Championships medalists for Great Britain
Rowers at the 2020 Summer Olympics
Medalists at the 2020 Summer Olympics
Olympic medalists in rowing
Olympic bronze medallists for Great Britain
21st-century British people